Long-chain acyl-(acyl-carrier-protein) reductase (long-chain acyl-[acp] reductase, fatty acyl-[acyl-carrier-protein] reductase, acyl-[acp] reductase) is an enzyme with systematic name long-chain-aldehyde:NAD(P)+ oxidoreductase (acyl-(acyl-carrier protein)-forming). This enzyme catalyses the following chemical reaction

 a long-chain aldehyde + acyl-carrier protein + NAD(P)+  a long-chain acyl-[acyl-carrier protein] + NAD(P)H + H+

This enzyme catalyses the reaction in the opposite direction.

References

External links 
 

EC 1.2.1